Yury A. Petrov (born March 30, 1984) is a Russian professional ice hockey forward who is currently an unrestricted free agent. He most recently played for Admiral Vladivostok in the Kontinental Hockey League (KHL).

Petrov made his KHL debut playing with Lada Togliatti during the 2008–09 season. Petrov returned to Lada in the 2014–15 season, after previously playing with HC Sibir Novosibirsk and Lokomotiv Yaroslavl.

References

External links

1984 births
Living people
Admiral Vladivostok players
Avangard Omsk players
HC CSK VVS Samara players
HC Lada Togliatti players
HC Sibir Novosibirsk players
Lokomotiv Yaroslavl players
Sportspeople from Tolyatti
Russian ice hockey forwards
Traktor Chelyabinsk players